The Apprentice Aotearoa is a New Zealand reality television series currently airing on TVNZ 1 started on 10 May 2021. It featured Mike Pero as the CEO. The winner received NZ$50,000 and one-on-one mentoring with Pero. The advisors are Cassie Roma and Justin Tomlinson.

The series initially aired in 2010 under the title The Apprentice New Zealand.

Candidates

Weekly results 

  The candidate was hired and won the competition. 
  The candidate was on the losing team.
  The candidate won as project manager on his/her team.
  The candidate lost as project manager on his/her team.
  The candidate was brought to the final boardroom.
  The candidate was fired.
  The candidate lost as project manager and was fired.

Challenges

Week 1 

 Air Date: 10 May 2021
 Project managers: Michael (Mana) and Kyria (Tahi)
 Task: To come up with a new popcorn flavour that would appeal to both kids and parents
 Result: Tahi received 25,000 orders. Mana received 11,500 orders.
 Winner: Tahi
 Reward: Sabrage Champagne Bar
 Brought into the boardroom: Michael, Tony, Ish
 Fired: Ish Ryklief
 Reasons for firing: Quiet throughout the task and in the boardroom and throwing himself under the bus.

Week 2 
 Air Date: 17 May 2021
 Project managers: Bari (Mana) and Nicola (Tahi)
 Task: To design and sell a new range of summer robes to two leading retailers.
 Result: Tahi received 1,300 orders with a profit of $156,000. Mana received 400 orders with a profit of $59,600.
 Winner: Tahi
 Reward: Beer tasting session and tour at Brothers' Brewery
 Brought into the boardroom: Bari, Gabriel, Stephen
 Fired: Bari Samadi
 Reasons for firing: Made costly decisions and didn't focus the team

Week 3 
 Air Date: 24 May 2021
 Team reshuffle: Stephen and Tony moved to Tahi, Kyria, Nicola and Vanessa moved to Mana.
 Project managers: Kennedy (Mana) and Tony (Tahi)
 Task: To create a social media campaign aiming to get Kiwis to Hamilton
 Result:  Tahi fulfilled the brief better than Mana.
 Winner:  Tahi
 Reward: MASU Restaurant SkyCity
 Brought into the boardroom:  Kennedy, Kyria, Nicola
 Fired:  Nicola Spicer
 Reasons for firing:  Responsible for presentation team and failed to lead the team

Week 4 
 Air Date: 31 May 2021
 Project managers: Vanessa (Mana) and Shardae (Tahi)
 Task: To create and sell ice cream at an Auckland farmer's market.
 Result: Tahi made a profit of $342.47, while Mana made a profit of $509.03.
 Winner: Mana
 Reward: A 1920's high tea at Hotel DeBrett.
 Brought into the boardroom: Shardae, Erna, Stephen
 Fired: Shardae Mitha
 Reasons for firing: For not controlling the negativity within her team.

Week 5 

Air Date: 7 Jun 2021
 Project managers: Kyria, initially Gabriel (Mana), and Erna (Tahi)
 Task: To create a new eco shampoo and conditioner product.
 Result: Tahi received 729 orders, Mana received 230 orders. 
 Winner: Tahi
 Reward: Ten-pin bowling at Archie Brothers Cirque Electriq
 Brought into the boardroom: Kyria, Gabriel, Michael
 Fired: Kyria Warren
 Reasons for firing: For the pitch and bringing Michael to the boardroom instead of Kennedy.

Week 6 

Air Date: 14 Jun 2021
Project managers: Gabriel (Mana) and Olivia (Tahi)
Task: Purchase a list of ten items at the lowest possible price.
 Result: Mana's total spend was $313, Tahi's total spend was $332.90.
 Winner: Mana
 Reward: A premium Go-karting experience at BlastaCars.
 Brought into the boardroom: Olivia, Erna, Tony
 Fired: Olivia Rogers
 Reasons for firing: For not bringing Megan to the final boardroom.

Week 7 
 Air Date: 21 Jun 2021
 Project managers: Michael (Mana) and Stephen (Tahi)
 Task: Negotiate with vendors to sell their products at the Go Green Expo.
 Result: Tahi's total commissions were $928, Mana's total commissions were $1,474.
 Winner: Mana
 Reward: Private session at Holey Moley.
 Brought into the Boardroom: Stephen, Megan, Tony
 Fired: Megan Fernandes & Tony Collins
 Reasons for firing: Megan for not stepping up as project manager, losing the pitch to secure Rock-It Boards, being a bit player in the previous task and Pero felt she didn't want the investment as much as the others. Tony for his poor negotiation skills, only making one sale and his mistakes in the previous task.

Week 8 
 Air Date: 28 Jun 2021
 Team reshuffle: Gabriel is moved to Tahi.
 Project managers: Michael (Mana) and Gabriel (Tahi)
 Task: Run a charity auction for the RMHC.
 Result: Tahi raised $9,285, Mana raised $12,670.
 Winner: Mana
 Reward: Getting pampered by Beauty on Demand at the house.
 Brought into the Boardroom: Gabriel, Erna (Stephen dismissed by Pero)
 Fired: Gabriel Elkhishin
 Reasons for firing: For lacking experience and appropriate skill set.

Week 9 
 Air Date: 5 Jul 2021
 Project managers: Vanessa (Mana) and Erna (Tahi)
 Task: Run a coach tour around Auckland for senior citizens.
 Result: Tahi made $2016, Mana made $1672.
 Winner: Tahi
 Reward: A picnic at the Parnell Rose Gardens.
 Brought into the Boardroom: Vanessa, Kennedy (Michael dismissed by Pero)
 Fired: Kennedy Anderson
 Reasons for firing: For struggling on the task and being less consistent than Vanessa.

Week 10 
 Air Date: 12 Jul 2021
 Team reshuffle: Stephen moved to Mana, Michael moved to Tahi.
 Project managers: Stephen (Mana) and Michael (Tahi)
 Task: Pitch for and fulfil a gardening contract at Pah Homestead, and sell gardening services door-to-door.
 Result: Tahi's total revenue was $220. Mana's total revenue was $390.
 Winner: Mana
 Reward: Massage at Sofitel Auckland
 Brought into the Boardroom: Michael, Erna
 Fired: Erna Basson
 Reasons for firing: Overshadowed by Michael in the task, and contribution towards losing the Pah Homestead pitch.

Week 11 
 Air Date: 19 Jul 2021
 Semi-finalists: Michael, Stephen, Vanessa
 Task: The top three undergo intense interviews with three of New Zealand's top businesspeople.
 Fired: Michael Wilson
 Reasons for firing: Couldn't commit to his new business on a full-time basis.

Week 12 (The Final) 
 Air Date: 20 Jul 2021
 Finalists: Stephen, Vanessa
 Stephen's Team: Gabriel, Kennedy, Megan, Olivia, Tony
 Vanessa's Team: Erna, Kyria, Michael, Nicola, Shardae
 Task: Finalists pitch their businesses to Mike Pero, his advisors and a panel of industry experts.
 Hired: Vanessa Goodson
 Reasons for hiring: More commercially viable business, strong brand identity, passion and personality.

References

External links 

 Official Website - TVNZ

2021 New Zealand television series debuts
2020s New Zealand television series
English-language television shows
New Zealand reality television series
TVNZ 1 original programming
The Apprentice (franchise)
New Zealand television series based on British television series